Sapotes is a genus of broad-nosed weevils in the beetle family Curculionidae. There are about five described species in Sapotes.

Species
These five species belong to the genus Sapotes:
 Sapotes caseyi Jones & O?Brien, 2007 c g
 Sapotes longipilis Van Dyke, 1934 i c g b
 Sapotes puncticollis Casey, 1888 i c g
 Sapotes setosus Jones & O?Brien, 2007 c g
 Sapotes sordidus Jones & O?Brien, 2007 c g
Data sources: i = ITIS, c = Catalogue of Life, g = GBIF, b = Bugguide.net

References

Further reading

 
 
 
 

Entiminae
Articles created by Qbugbot